An urchin barren is an area of the shallow part of the ocean where the population growth of sea urchins has gone unchecked, causing destructive grazing of kelp forests.

Process
Sea urchins eat kelp holdfasts. This can be caused by a lack of sea otters or other predators in the area, which makes it extremely important to protect the ecological balance in a kelp forest. Keystone species such as the sea otter help maintain healthy kelp communities; however, likely because of increased killer whale predation, their numbers are in decline in areas of Western Alaska. Off the California coast, storm runoff, erosion and polluted water allow less light to penetrate, weakening the kelp. Sea urchins then can move in and settle.

Despite their name, urchin barrens are usually abundant with marine invertebrate life, echinoderms in particular. Species such as the sunflower starfishes, brittle stars, and the purple sea urchin are common. Although macrofauna such as these are aplenty, there is little primary productivity among microorganisms. This makes it difficult for newly settled sea urchins (juveniles) to survive, making barrens more dangerous for juveniles than for adults. Once having wiped out a kelp forest, the environment becomes unsupportive of new sea urchin settlement and adults are forced to find a new resource.

Shift theories
An area of the subtidal where the population growth of sea urchins has gone unchecked causes destructive grazing of kelp beds or kelp forests (specifically the giant brown bladder kelp, Macrocystis). The transition from kelp forest to barren is defined by phase shifts in which one stable community state is shifted to another. The continuous phase shift is widely accepted. This describes a transition from one ecosystem state to another where the threshold for the forward shift is at the same level as the threshold for the reverse shift back to the previous state. In other words, a kelp bed can re-establish itself when urchin grazing intensity decreases to the threshold density triggering the initial shift.

Alternatively, another theory posits that both sea urchin barrens and kelp-beds represent alternative stable states, meaning that an ecosystem can exist under multiple states, each with a set of unique biotic and abiotic conditions (i.e. barren except for urchins or flourishing with kelp). Those who argue for this theory propose several criteria: that different self-replacing communities dominate the site; each state exists longer than one complete turnover of the dominant community or species; and that following a disturbance (e.g. a storm), the system returns to the previous state.

Impacted areas
Over the past four decades, barrens have been reported along coastlines around the world, everywhere from Nova Scotia to Chile. They can either span over a thousand kilometers of coastline or occur in small patches.

References

Aquatic ecology
Echinoidea